The risorius muscle is a muscle of facial expression. It arises from the fascia over the parotid gland, and inserts into the angle of the mouth. It is supplied by the facial nerve (CN VII). It may be absent or asymmetrical in some people. It retracts the angle of the mouth during smiling.

Structure 
The risorius muscle arises in the fascia over the parotid gland. Passing horizontally forward, superficial to the platysma muscle, it inserts onto the skin at the angle of the mouth. It is a narrow bundle of fibers, broadest at its origin, but varies much in its size and form. It is superficial to the masseter muscle, partially covering it.

Nerve supply
Like all muscles of facial expression, the risorius is supplied by the facial nerve (CN VII). The specific branch is debated, with some sources giving marginal mandibular branch of the facial nerve and others giving buccal branch of the facial nerve.

Development
It has been suggested that the risorius muscle is only found in Homininae (African great apes and humans).

Variation
The risorius muscle may be absent in a significant minority of people, and may be asymmetrical.

Function
The risorius muscle retracts the angle of the mouth to produce a smile, albeit an insincere-looking one that does not involve the skin around the eyes. Compare with a real smile, which raises the lips with the action of zygomaticus major and zygomaticus minor muscles and causes "crow's feet" around the eyes using the orbicularis oculi muscles.

Additional images

References

External links

 PTCentral

Muscles of the head and neck